The Alfa Romeo Tipo 512 was intended to replace the Alfa Romeo 158 Voiturette racing car. It was designed by Wifredo Ricart as his second car for Alfa Romeo after the V16 engined Alfa Romeo Tipo 162.

It was the first mid-engined Alfa Romeo intended racing car. It was fitted with a flat 12 engine (technically speaking it is a 180 degree V12) using a mid-engine layout. The engine had very short stroke compared to other Grands Prix cars at that time, only  (bore 54mm).

On June 19, 1940 Alfa Romeo's test driver Attilio Marinoni was killed while testing the 512 suspension fitted to an Alfetta 158.

Later, on September 12, 1940, the Tipo 512 was first tested, by Alfa Romeo chief test driver Consalvo Sanesi; despite being very powerful its handling was not thought to be good enough.

Car development was stopped during World War II. Another chassis was built, but that car never raced. Both prototypes are currently on display at the Alfa Romeo Historical Museum in Arese, Italy. 

The potential of this machine is not very clear, since it remained an unraced prototype.

Alfa Romeo eventually won the Formula 1 World Championship with the Alfetta 158 in 1950, taking the place for which the 512 was originally designed.

References

Grand Prix cars
Tipo 512 Grand Prix racer